Gaotang lake is a shallow freshwater lake in China's Anhui province, on the borders of Huainan, Dingyuan County and Fengyang County. The lake is intensively used for aquaculture (black carp among others).

In 1956, a sluice was built in the outflow of the lake, mainly to prevent water from the Huaihe River from moving upstream.

References

Lakes of Anhui